The 1987 WTA Argentine Open was a women's tennis tournament played on outdoor clay courts at the Buenos Aires Lawn Tennis Club in Buenos Aires, Argentina and was part of the Category 1 tier of the 1988 Virginia Slims World Championship Series. The tournament ran from 30 November until 6 December 1987. First-seeded Gabriela Sabatini won the singles title.

Leaders

Singles

 Gabriela Sabatini defeated  Isabel Cueto 6–0, 6–2
 It was Sabatini's 3rd title of the year and the 12th of her career.

Doubles

 Mercedes Paz /  Gabriela Sabatini defeated  Jill Hetherington /  Christiane Jolissaint 6–2, 6–2
 It was Paz's 2nd title of the year and the 8th of her career. It was Sabatini's 4th title of the year and the 13th of her career.

References

External links
 ITF tournament edition details

WTA Argentine Open
WTA Argentine Open
WTA Argentine Open
WTA Argentine Open
WTA Argentine Open